Nurhayati may refer to:

Nurhayati (born 1997), Indonesian singer and former member of JKT48
Nurhayati (footballer) (born 2002), Indonesian footballer
Nurhayati Ali Assegaf (born 1963), Indonesian politician